Opinion polling for the 2013 Czech legislative election started immediately after the 2010 legislative election.

Percentage

Previous polls

Note on varying poll methodology: STEM records all responses (including undecided, won't vote) to percentage. The figures in table are adjusted to correspond with other surveys excluding those undecided or abstaining.

Seats

References

2013
2013 Czech legislative election